Walter Taylor may refer to:

Australia
Walter Taylor (contractor) (1872–1955), Australian builder of Brisbane landmarks

United Kingdom
Walter Taylor (engineer) (1734–1803), pioneer of the saw mill in England
Walter Taylor (footballer) (born 1901), English footballer
Walter Taylor (mathematician) (c. 1700–1743/4), tutor at Trinity College, Cambridge
Walter Ross Taylor (1805–1896), Scottish minister
Walter Ross Taylor (1838–1907), Scottish minister, son of the above

United States of America
Walter Taylor (archaeologist) (1913–1997), American anthropologist and archaeologist
Walter C. Taylor (1870–1929), North Dakota Commissioner of Agriculture and Labor
Walter Taylor (American football), head football coach for the Virginia Military Institute Keydet, 1891
Walter Taylor (baseball), American baseball player
Walter H. Taylor (1838–1916), Virginia lawyer, businessman, and soldier, aide-de-camp to General Robert E. Lee
Walter Nesbit Taylor, American educator and Mississippi state senator
Dub Taylor (1907–1994), American actor, given name Walter Clarence Taylor Jr.
Buck Taylor (born 1938), American actor, son of Dub Taylor, given name Walter Clarence Taylor III